Jub Sorkh-e Sofla (also Romanized as Jūb Sorkh-e Soflá; also known as Jū Sorkh-e Pā'īn) is a village in Bijnavand Rural District, in the Zagros District of Chardavol County, Ilam Province, Iran. At the 2006 census, its population was 118, in 28 families. The village is populated by Kurds.

References 

Populated places in Chardavol County
Kurdish settlements in Ilam Province